Morris Schröter (born 20 August 1995) is a German professional footballer who plays as a midfielder for Hansa Rostock.

Club career
In July 2021, Schröter signed with Dynamo Dresden.

Before the 2022–23 season, he moved to Hansa Rostock on a two-year contract.

References

Living people
1995 births
German footballers
Association football midfielders
3. Liga players
2. Bundesliga players
1. FC Magdeburg players
FSV Zwickau players
Dynamo Dresden players
FC Hansa Rostock players